The Seidelmann 24, sometimes called the Seidelmann 24-1, is an American trailerable sailboat that was designed by Bob Seidelmann, Bruce Kirby and W. Ross, as a racer-cruiser and first built in 1981.

Production
The design was built by Seidelmann Yachts in the United States and Paceship Yachts in Canada, starting in 1981. A total of 38 boats were completed, but it is now out of production.

Design
The Seidelmann 24 is a racing keelboat, built predominantly of fiberglass, with wood trim. It has a fractional sloop rig, a raked stem, a reverse transom, a transom-hung rudder controlled by a tiller and a fixed stub keel and retractable centerboard. It displaces  and carries  of ballast.

The boat is normally fitted with a small outboard motor for docking and maneuvering.

The design has sleeping accommodation for four people, with a double "V"-berth in and two settee berths around a removable table. The galley is located amidships on the port side and is equipped with a two-burner alcohol-fired stove, a portable icebox and a stainless steel sink. The cabin sole is made from teak and holly.

See also
List of sailing boat types

References

Keelboats
1980s sailboat type designs
Sailing yachts
Trailer sailers
Sailboat type designs by Bob Seidelmann
Sailboat type designs by Bruce Kirby
Sailboat types built by Seidelmann Yachts